Schirnding is a municipality  in the district of Wunsiedel in Bavaria in Germany. Schirnding station is a border station on the Nuremberg–Cheb railway.

Musicologist Reinhard Schulz (1950–2009) was born in the place.

References

Wunsiedel (district)

pl:Schirnding